Gyges (Akkadian:  ,  ; ; ; reigned c. 680-644 BC) was the founder of the Mermnad dynasty of Lydian kings and the first known king of the Lydian kingdom to have attempted to transform it into a powerful empire. Gyges reigned 38 years according to Herodotus.

Attestations and etymology
The name  is derived from the Ancient Greek form  recorded by Graeco-Roman authors.

If this etymology is accurate, it correlates with the probability of a Carian origin of the Mermnad dynasty.

Attestations of Gyges's name from the period of the Lydian kingdom are found on the legends of coins by his great-grandson Alyattes, reading , meaning "I am of Kukaś".

Life, reign and death
Nothing is known about Gyges's origins except for the Greek historian Herodotus's claim that he was the son of a man named Dascylus.

Rise to power
Available historical evidence suggests that Gyges became the king of Lydia by overthrowing his predecessor, the king Candaules of the Heraclid dynasty. Gyges was helped in his coup against Candaules by a Carian prince from Mylasa named Arselis, suggesting that Gyges's Mermnad dynasty might have had good relations with Carian aristocrats thanks to which these latter would provide his rebellion with armed support against Candaules. Gyges's rise to power happened in the context of a period of turmoil following the invasion of the Cimmerians, a nomadic people from the Eurasian Steppe who had invaded Western Asia, who around 675 BC destroyed the previous major power in Anatolia, the kingdom of Phrygia.

Immediately after Gyges had seized the Lydian throne, the oracle of the god Apollo at Delphi confirmed the legitimity of his kingship. To thank the oracle, Gyges offered it lavish offerings consisting of gold and silver. The most notable of these offerings were six crates made of gold and which collectively weighed thirty talents.

Wars against the Ionians
Gyges took advantage of the power vacuum created by the Cimmerian invasions to consolidate his kingdom and make it a military power, and, to this end, immediately after coming to power he attacked the Ionian Greek cities of Miletus, Smyrna, and Colophon. Gyges was however unable to conquer Miletus and he made peace with the city, following which Gyges accorded to the Milseians the privilege to colonise the coastal areas of Asia Minor under Lydian control. Gyges's attempt to capture Smyrna likewise failed the inhabitants of the city were successfully able to repel his attacks, after which peaceful and friendly relations would be established between Lydia and this city, leading to the Lydians using the port of Smyrna to export their products and import grain, Lydian craftsmen being allowed to settle in Smyrniot workshops. These close ties between Smyrna and Lydia ended when Gyges's great-grandson Alyattes conquered Smyrna around 600 BC. Gyges's attack on Colophon was more successful in that he was able to seize control of its lower city only, and Colophon soon regained its independence and would not be subjected to Lydian rule again until Alyattes conquered it.

Alliance with the Carians
To the south, Gyges continued maintaining alliances with the dynasts of the various city-states of the Carians which required the Lydian and Carian rulers had to support each other, and his successors would continue to maintain these alliances and solidify them through matrimonial relations. These connections established between the Lydian kings and the Carian city-states ensured that the Lydians were able to control Caria through alliances with Carian dynasts ruling over fortified settlements, such as Mylasa and Pedasa, and through Lydian aristocrats settled in Carian cities, such as in Aphrodisias. In addition to diplomatic ties, the Lydians also shared strong cultural connections with the Carians, such as sharing the sanctuary of the god Zeus of Mylasa with the Carians and the Mysians because they believed these three peoples descended from three brothers.

Gyges entertained better relations with the leading Aeolian Greek city of Cyme, which had already established relations of friendship with Lydia during the preceding Heraclid dynasty, and with the Ionian Greek city of Ephesus, whose tyrant, Melas the Elder, married one of the daughters of Gyges. These friendly ties with Ephesus would be renewed by Gyges's son Ardys through the marriage of his daughter Lyde with Melas's grandson Miletus, and by Gyges's great-grandson Alyattes, who married one of his daughters to the Ephesian tyrant Melas the Younger, himself a descendant of both Melas the Elder and of Miletus. These friendly relations between Lydia and Ephesus would continue until they would be broken by Gyges's great-great-grandson Croesus.

Wars with the Cimmerians
In 665 BC, Gyges was faced with a war with the Cimmerians. Around the same time, according to Neo-Assyrian records, Gyges had a dream where the Assyrian god Aššur appeared to him and told him to seek help from Ashurbanipal and send him tribute. Gyges contacted the Neo-Assyrian court by sending diplomats to Nineveh, but offered him presents only, rather than tribute, and therefore refused to become a vassal of Assyria. Gyges soon defeated the Cimmerian invaders without Assyrian help, and he sent Cimmerian soldiers captured while ravaging Lydian lands to Nineveh.

Conquests
After having repelled the Cimmerians, and with the leading Aeolian Greek city of Cyme already having good relations with Lydia, Gyges took advantage of the power vacuum caused by the destruction of the Phrygian kingdom by the Cimmerians to conquer the Troad region in northern Anatolia without facing much resistance, following which he installed Lydian settlers in the region and created a hunting reserve in Cyzicus. Under Lydian rule, the city of Ilium acquired an important position and became a local administrative centre from which the Lydians exerted their power over the whole Aegean coast of the Troad as well as the coast of the Hellespont where was located the cities of Achilleion, Abydos, and Neandreia. Furthermore, the Lydian rulers built connections with Illium so they could make profits out of the gold mines of Astyra. The southern part of the Troad, where were located Gargara, Antandrus, Assos, and Lamponeia to the south of Mount Ida and on the shore of the Edremit Gulf, was administered from Adrymettium. In accordance with the monopoly of establishing colonies on lands ruled by the Lydians which Gyges had granted to Miletus, Greek settlers from that city founded the colony of Abydus.

Sending mercenaries to Egypt
Gyges's extensive alliances with the Carian dynasts allowed him to recruit Carian and Ionian Greek soldiers to send overseas to assist the Egyptian king Psamtik I of the city of Sais, with whom he had established contacts around 662 BC. With the help of these armed forces, Psamtik I united Egypt under his rule after eliminating the eleven other kinglets with whom he had been co-ruling Lower Egypt following Esarhaddon's and Ashurbanipal's invasions.

Interpretations of these actions as an alliance between Lydia and Sais against Assyria, however, are inaccurate; Psamtik I's military activities were directed solely against the other local kinglets of Lower Egypt and not against Assyria, although Ashurbanipal disapproved of Psamtik I's actions since he knew he needed these kinglets' support to maintain Assyrian power in Egypt. Moreover, not only had the Assyrians risen Sais into preeminence in Egypt after expelling the Saites' Kushite enemies from the country, but the two kings had signed a treaty with each other, and no hostilities between them is recorded. Thus Psamtik I and Ashurbanipal had remained allies ever since the former had been put in power with Assyrian military support.  Furthermore, the silence of Assyrian sources concerning Psamtik I's expansion imply there was no hostility, whether overt or covert, between Assyria and Sais during Psamtik I's unification of Egypt under his rule.

Likewise, Gyges's military support of Psamtik I was not directed against Assyria and is not mentioned as hostile to Assyria or allied with other countries against Assyria in Assyrian records; the Assyrian disapproval of Gyges's support for Psamtik I was primarily motivated by Gyges's refusal to form an alliance with Assyria and his undertaking of these actions independently of Assyria, which the Assyrians interpreted as an act of arrogance, rather than by the support itself.

Gyges's military support to Psamtik I lasted until 658 BC, at which point he faced an impending Cimmerian invasion. The Cimmerians invaded Lydia again in 657 BC, though not much is known about this attack except that Gyges survived it. This event is recorded in the Assyrian oracular reports, where it is called a "bad omen" for the "Westland", that is for Lydia.

Death
In 644 BC, Lydia faced a third attack by the Cimmerians, led by their king Lygdamis. This time, the Lydians were defeated, Sardis was sacked, and Gyges was killed. Assyrian records blamed Gyges's defeat and death on his decision to act independently from Assyria by sending troops to Psamtik I, and his ending of diplomacy with Assyria, which the Assyrians interpreted as an act of arrogance. He was succeeded by his son Ardys, who resumed diplomatic activity with Assyria and would also have to face the Cimmerians.

Legacy

Gyges's name was later used on the legends of coins by his great-grandson Alyattes, which read , meaning "I am of Kukaś".

Mythical Gyges
Like many kings of early antiquity, including Midas of Phrygia and even the more historically documented Alexander the Great, Gyges was subject to mythologizing. The motives for such stories are many; one possibility is that the myths embody religious beliefs or practices.

Allegorical accounts of Gyges' rise to power

Authors throughout ancient history have told differing stories of Gyges' rise to power, which considerably vary in detail, but virtually all involve Gyges seizing the throne after killing the king, Candaules, and marrying Candaules' widow.

The main source for Gyges is Herodotus, whose account may be traced to the poet Archilochus of Paros. In this, Gyges was a bodyguard of Candaules, who believed his wife to be the most beautiful woman on Earth. He insisted upon Gyges seeing his wife disrobed and the betrayal so enraged her that she afterwards gave Gyges the choice of murdering her husband and making himself king, or of being put to death himself.

Herodotus goes on to record how Gyges plied the Oracle with numerous gifts, notably six mixing bowls minted of gold extracted from the Pactolus river weighing thirty talents. The Oracle confirmed Gyges as the rightful king of Lydia and gave moral support to the Lydians in their conflict with the Ionians. The priestess nevertheless declared that the dynasty of Gyges would fall in the fifth generation. This prediction was later fulfilled when Gyges' fourth descendant, Croesus, lost the kingdom as a result of attacking the Achaemenid Empire of Cyrus the Great.

In Plato's Republic, an ancestor of Gyges was a shepherd who discovered a magic ring of invisibility, by means of which he murdered the king and won the affection of the queen. 

Nicolaus of Damascus supplies his own version of the story that is quite different from both Herodotus and Plato. It involves a multi-generational curse by an old King Ardys of Lydia, because his trusted advisor Dascylus was murdered by Ardys’ son named Sadyattes (or Adyattes). This Sadyattes was envious of Dascylus’ growing power. The murderers were never discovered, so King Ardys issued a curse upon them.

Dascylus’ wife, being then pregnant, escapes to Phrygia (her home), and gives birth to a son, also named Dascylus. Later this Dascylus has a son Gyges who, as a young man arrives to Lydia and is recognized by the king for his outstanding abilities. He is appointed to the royal bodyguard.

Gyges soon became a favourite of Candaules and was dispatched by him to fetch Tudo, the daughter of Arnossus of Mysia, whom the Lydian king wished to make his queen. On the way Gyges fell in love with Tudo, who complained to Sadyates of his conduct. Forewarned that the king intended to punish him with death, Gyges assassinated Candaules in the night and seized the throne. According to Plutarch, Gyges seized power with the help of Arselis of Mylasa, the captain of the Lydian bodyguard, whom he had won over to his cause.

Other legends about Gyges
In the second book of Plato's philosophical work The Republic, Glaucon recounts the story of the Ring of Gyges to Socrates, using it to illustrate a point about human nature. Some scholars have suggested that Plato's story was based on a now-lost older version of the myth, while others argue that Plato invented it himself, using elements from Herodotus's story of Gyges. It told of a man named Gyges who lived in Lydia, an area in modern Turkey. He was a shepherd for the king of that land. One day, there was an earthquake while Gyges was out in the fields, and he noticed that a new cave had opened up in a rock face. When he went in to see what was there, he noticed a gold ring on the finger of a former giant king who had been buried in the cave, in an iron horse with a window in its side. He took the ring away with him and soon discovered that it allowed the wearer to become invisible. The next time he went to the palace to give the king a report about his sheep, he put the ring on, seduced the queen, killed the king, and took control of the palace.

In The Republic, Glaucon argues that men are inherently unjust, and are only restrained from unjust behavior by the fetters of law and society. In Glaucon's view, unlimited power blurs the difference between just and unjust men. "Suppose there were two such magic rings," he tells Socrates, "and the just [man] put on one of them and the unjust the other; no man can be imagined to be of such an iron nature that he would stand fast in justice. No man would keep his hands off what was not his own when he could safely take what he liked out of the market or go into houses and lie with anyone at his pleasure, or kill or release from prison whom he would, and in all respects be like a god among men. Then the actions of the just would be as the actions of the unjust; they would both come at last to the same point."  Socrates concludes, however, that a truly just man is not a slave to his appetites, so that the opportunities afforded by the ring would not tempt him to abandon his principles.

Many Bible scholars believe that Gyges of Lydia was the Biblical figure of Gog, ruler of Magog, who is mentioned in the Book of Ezekiel and the Book of Revelation.

Influence on modern works
 Théophile Gautier wrote a story entitled "Le roi Candaule" (published in 1844), which was translated by Lafcadio Hearn.
 "Tsar Kandavl" or "Le Roi Candaule" is a grand ballet with choreography by Marius Petipa, and music by Cesare Pugni, with a libretto by Jules-Henri Vernoy de Saint-Georges, based on the Herodotus version. It was first presented by the Imperial Ballet in  St. Petersburg, Russia, in 1868, with Henriette D'or as Queen Nisia, Felix Kschessinsky as King Candaules/Tsar Candavl, Lev Ivanov as Gyges and Klavdia Kantsyreva as Claytia.
 "Le Roi Candaule" is also the title of a comedy by Henri Meilhac and Ludovic Halévy, loosely based on the ancient tale and presenting light sketches of Parisian life in the 1860s and 1870s.
 German playwright Friedrich Hebbel's 1856 tragedy Gyges und sein Ring ("Gyges and his Ring").
 In the novel Temporary Kings, penultimate in Anthony Powell's 12-volume A Dance to the Music of Time, Candaules' exhibiting of his naked wife to Gyges and her discovery of it feature on a ceiling painting, attributed to Tiepolo, in a Venetian palace.  The story counterpoints themes of voyeurism and death in Powell's narrative.
 In the novel The English Patient, and the film based on it, Count Almásy (himself a disciple of Herodotus), falls in love with a married woman (Katherine Clifton) as she tells Herodotus' version of the Gyges story around a campfire. The story is harbinger of their own tragic path.
In the novel Hyperion by Dan Simmons, one of the four evil constructs created by the Core and named by Councillor Albedo is called Gyges.
 One of the chapters in Robertson Davies' novel Fifth Business is called "Gyges and King Candaules". The protagonist, scholar Dunstan Ramsay; his lifelong "friend and enemy", the tycoon Percy "Boy" Staunton; and Staunton's wife Leola who had been Ramsay's childhood sweetheart are throughout the book  compared with, respectively, Gyges, King Candaules and the Queen of Lydia. In particular, in one scene where Staunton insists upon showing Ramsay nude photos of his wife, Ramsay tells him the ancient story as a warning (which Staunton ignores).
 In 1990 Frederic Raphael published The Hidden I, A Myth Revised, a retelling of the story of Lydia, King Candaules and Gyges.
 J. R. R. Tolkien (writer of The Hobbit and The Lord of the Rings) may have been influenced by Plato's accounts of King Gyges.

Notes

Sources

External links 
 
 Livius.org: Gyges of Lydia 

 
8th-century BC births
644 BC deaths
7th-century BC rulers in Asia
Bodyguards
Fictional characters who can turn invisible
Kings of Lydia
Mermnad dynasty
Monarchs killed in action
Regicides
Shepherds